Piotrawin-Kolonia  is a village in the administrative district of Gmina Łaziska, within Opole Lubelskie County, Lublin Voivodeship, in eastern Poland.

References

Piotrawin-Kolonia